The Beneteau 323 is a French sailboat that was designed by Jean Marie Finot and Pascal Conq of Group Finot/Conq and first built in 2001.

The Beneteau 323 was also marketed as the Beneteau Oceanis 323, as well as the Beneteau Oceanis Clipper 323 and a version was sold as the Moorings 32.2.

The design was named Boat of the Year at the 2004 Oslo Boat Show.

Production
The design was built by Beneteau in France from 2003 until 2007, but it is now out of production.

Design

The Beneteau 323 is a recreational keelboat, built predominantly of fibreglass. The hull is single skin polyester fiberglass, while the deck is a polyester fibreglass and balsa sandwich. It has a masthead sloop rig with a deck-stepped mast and aluminium spars, a nearly plumb stem, a rounded reverse transom with a walk-through swimming platform, an internally mounted spade-type rudder controlled by a wheel. Optionally it was built with a fixed fin (shoal draft) keel, deep draft keel or stub keel with a centreboard combination.

Variants
Fin keel (shoal draft)
Deep draft
Centerboard and stub keel
It displaces  and carries  of cast iron ballast.

Operational history

In a 2010 review Heather Holm described the design, "the Beneteau 323 is a fast, responsive and comfortable coastal cruiser. With an LOA of 32’10” (10m) and LWL of 29’2″, she has “long legs” that can take you where you want to go. She can easily be sailed single-handed."

A boat US review by naval architect Jack Hornor, described the boat in 2014: "the sailing performance of the Beneteau 323 is a bit of a mixed blessing. By my calculations, sail area/displacement ratio is 19.6 and displacement/length ratio is 168. With these numbers it is not surprising that the 323 is an excellent light air performer. On the other hand, the ballast is only 26% of total displacement and even though the VCG (vertical center of gravity) is lowered with the modified-bulb keel, it not surprising that she is also reported to be a bit tender. Her broad beam and wide transom make it more important that she be sailed flat - like the big dinghy she resembles."

A 2015 review by Rupert Holmes in Boats.com, said, "In many ways the Beneteau Oceanis 323 set new standards for 32ft cruising yachts when it was first launched in 2004. A combination of higher freeboard, allied to a wide beam that’s carried well aft and a stepped coachroof produced a boat with significantly more volume than earlier designs of this size. At the same time, an efficient deep keel option was offered, which helped to make the boat one that could be expected to take offshore passages in its stride."

See also

List of sailing boat types

Similar sailboats
Aloha 32
Bayfield 30/32
C&C 32
Columbia 32
Contest 32 CS
Hunter 32 Vision
Hunter 326
Mirage 32
Morgan 32
Ontario 32
Nonsuch 324
Ranger 32
Watkins 32

References

External links

Sailing yachts
Keelboats
2000s sailboat type designs
Sailboat type designs by Groupe Finot
Sailboat types built by Beneteau